Top Chef is an Arabic-language reality competition series based on the American television series of the same name. The contestants compete against each another in culinary challenges and are judged by the show presenter Siham Tueni, head chef Joe Barza, and a weekly panel of professional chefs and other personalities from the food industry, with one or more contestants eliminated in each episode.

Show format
Each episode has two main challenges; the Quickfire Challenge and the Elimination Challenge.

In the Quickfire Challenge, each contestant is required to cook a dish with specific requirements or participate in a culinary-related challenge within one hour or less. A guest judge selects one or more chefs as the best in the challenge.

In the Elimination Challenge, the contestants have to prepare one or more dishes to meet the challenge requirements. Some of these challenges can be individual while others could require teamwork. After the Elimination Challenge ends, the four judges consider the guests' comments and deliberate on the best and worst dishes.

Judges
Siham Tueini
Joe Barza

Guest Judges
Episodes 1 & 12: Yasser Jad – CEO of SARCA
Episodes 1 & 3: Joumana Salameh – Founder and executive manager of Hospitality New Magazine
Episode 2: Clovis Khoury – Owner of Maison Clovis restaurant, Lyon
Episode 2: Tony Saade - Owner of Montangnon restaurant
Episode 3: Roger Zaknoun – GM of La Plage, Derwande, Sofil Catering …
Episodes 3 & 12: Toufic Khouweiry - Owner of Kababji, U Bay, Table Fine
Episode 4: Sami Hawchar - Manager of Cater Trainment
Episode 4: Miled Rizkallah – GM of Mikana
Episode 4: Hala Nakhoul – Manager at Boecker World Holding Inc.
Episode 4: Anissa Helo – Owner of culinary school in London
Episode 4: Magdalene Roumi – Nutritionist and owner of Diet Delight
Episode 5: Alia Chaaraoui – Director/ board member of Noura
Episode 5: Michel Bayoud – CEO at Boecker World Holding Inc.
Episode 5: Fady Karam – GM of Buddha Bar
Episode 5: Olivier Gougon – Owner of Lady M Catering
Episode 5: Paul Ariss -  Head of Syndicate for food and beverages
Episode 5: Samer Sabbagh - – Manager of food and beverages at Emirates Airlines
Episode 5: Thomas Rizkallah – Owner of Buddha Bar
Episode 5: Pia Chaaraoui – Assistant manager at Noura
Episode 6: Thomas Gugler – Manager Menu development & costing, Executive master chef at Saudi Arabian Airlines catering
Episode 6: George Ojeil – Head of food and beverages at Le Royal Hotel
Episode 6: Joyce Mouawad – Sales and marketing manager at Le Royal Hotel
Episode 7: Claude Thomy – Owner and GM of Crepaway restaurant
Episode 7: Ralph Nader – GM of Ember Consulting and Beach International
Episode 7: Samer Rizk – Partner and GM of Le Capitol restaurant
Episode 7: Ziad Osseily – Partner in Le Capitol restaurant
Episode 8: Walid Rizkallah – Owner of Chez Sami restaurant
Episode 8: Tony Rami – Secretary General of the syndicate of owners of cafes, restaurants, and pastries in Lebanon
Episode 9: Walid Mouzanar – Owner of Aziz and Walid Mouzanar Jewelry
Episode 9: Alfred Osseily – Owner of La Table D’alfred restaurant
Episode 10: Nicolas Kattan – Owner and GM of Cat and Mouth Catering
Episode 10: Jessy Dibo – Partner in Galateo
Episode 10: Charles Azar - Executive chef at Four Season’s Hotel, Beirut
Episode 10: Fernando Gomez – International executive chef
Episode 11: Anthony Maalouf – Owner of Casper and Gambini’s
Episode 11: Dory Rizk – GM of Afkar Holding
Episode 11: Cherine Yazbeck – World Gourmant 2010 award winner
Episode 12: Lyne Hajj Touma – GM of Le Tarylland
Episode 13: Jean Claude Ghossn - Chairman/GM for Ghia Holding
Episode 13: Marcello Zakaria  - Chef from Accademia Barilla
 Episode 13: Bruno Blancho – International chef from Moulinex
Episode 13: Pierre Daw - Head of marketing at Arla
Episode 13: Antoine Khoury – CEO of 19 hotels and 150 restaurants in  Group Partouche
Episode 13: Zeid Goussouss – Former Jordanian Minister of Tourism
Episode 13: Rogger Edde – Owner of Edde Sands

Contestants

Season 1
Nathalie Doumit, Lebanon
Moussabh Al Bedwawi, UAE
Michel Aoun, Lebanon
Marie-Therese Kassis, Lebanon
Maher Ramzi, Jordan
Joumana Mansouraty, Lebanon
Jean Habch, Lebanon
Hani Zein, KSA
Daoud Hanna, Lebanon
Chahira Daoud, Egypt
Abdul Alhawssawi, KSA
Daoud Hanna, Lebanon
Hani Al A’awil, Syria
Abdul Samad, KSA
Omar El Ghoul, Morocco – Winner of season 1
Sleiman Khawand, Lebanon
Soumaya Idrissi, KSA

References
http://outbound.indevcogroup.com/2011/04/napco-sponsors-season-1-of-top-chef.html
mancare la oala
https://web.archive.org/web/20110723232839/http://chefyousefkhumayes.com/news.htm

External links
Official LBC site

Middle East
2011 Lebanese television series debuts
2011 Lebanese television series endings
2010s Lebanese television series
Non-American television series based on American television series